Charles James Barnett (31 October 1796–31 December 1882) was an English amateur cricketer who played first-class cricket from 1820 to 1837 and a Whig politician who sat in the House of Commons from 1831 to 1835.

Barnett was born in Kensington, London the son of James Barnett, a banker and politician, and his wife Ann.

Mainly associated with Marylebone Cricket Club (MCC), Barnett made 29 known appearances in first-class matches. He represented the Gentlemen in the Gentlemen v Players series.

In 1825, Barnett became the first known president of MCC. This is an annual appointment and he was succeeded by Lord Frederick Beauclerk for 1826. There may have been earlier presidents but there is no record of them and it was on 28 July 1825 that the Lord's pavilion was burned down with the loss of all club records.

Barnett was elected Whig Member of Parliament (MP) for Maidstone in 1831 and held the seat until 1835.

Barnet was a J.P. and Deputy Lieutenant and in 1881 was living 
in Brighton. He died at Brighton at the age of 86.

Barnett married Sabine Louisa Curtis daughter of Sir William Curtis Bt at Marylebone on 29 June 1839.   The first of their seven recorded children, William Barnett, was born at Tetworth Hall, in Potton, Bedfordshire, where the family was then living, late in 1841.

References

External links 
 

1796 births
1882 deaths
English cricketers
English cricketers of 1787 to 1825
English cricketers of 1826 to 1863
Marylebone Cricket Club cricketers
Gentlemen cricketers
Members of the Parliament of the United Kingdom for English constituencies
UK MPs 1831–1832
UK MPs 1832–1835
Whig (British political party) MPs for English constituencies
The Bs cricketers
Non-international England cricketers
Marylebone Cricket Club Second 10 with 1 Other cricketers
Marylebone Cricket Club First 9 with 3 Others cricketers